Martin Sæterhaug (13 August 1882 – 23 August 1961) was a Norwegian speed skater and cyclist. He won silver medals at the 1908 and 1911 World Allround Speed Skating Championships and a bronze medal in 1910. In cycling, he competed in two events at the 1912 Summer Olympics.

References

External links
 

1882 births
1961 deaths
Norwegian male cyclists
Norwegian male speed skaters
Olympic cyclists of Norway
Cyclists at the 1912 Summer Olympics
Sportspeople from Møre og Romsdal
World Allround Speed Skating Championships medalists